The Faith and Globalisation Initiative (FGI) is an international group of universities created in 2008 by former British prime minister Tony Blair and his Faith Foundation.
The Faith and Globalisation Initiative is "bringing together some of the world’s leading research Universities to form a global network focusing on the emerging field of faith and globalisation".

History and key objectives
In 2008 Yale University was the first university the Foundation started working with and in 10 months it expanded the network to include the National University of Singapore, Durham University and McGill University. Two years later the Foundation developed an associate university programme which seeks to foster the study of faith and globalisation in a broad range of higher education institutions.

The institutions were selected on the basis of their ability to contribute to the Initiative, but also to ensure that they have a geographic and cultural spread that lends multiple perspectives to the discipline.

Key objectives of the FGI are the following:
 Develop multi-disciplinary teaching courses on Faith and Globalisation
 Advance knowledge in the field of Faith and Globalisation
 Disseminate university research related to Faith and Globalisation
 Engage policy-makers and the general public on the topic of Faith and Globalisation
 Support the implementation and development of the Foundation's Face to Faith and Faiths Act projects.

Universities
As of January 2011, the participating members of the Faith and Globalisation Network of Universities are:

Lead Universities:
 Yale University
 McGill University
 Tecnológico de Monterrey
 University of Western Australia
 National University of Singapore
 Peking University
 University of Hong Kong
 Fourah Bay College, University of Sierra Leone
 Banaras Hindu University
 University of Prishtina
 American University in Kosovo
 National University ‘Kiev-Mohyla Academy’
 Philippines Consortium (consisting of Ateneo de Manila, Ateneo de Zamboanga, Notre Dame (Cotabato) and   Mindanao State University)

Associate Universities:
 Wheaton College
 Pepperdine University
 Santa Clara University
 St. Mary's University College, Twickenham
 Winchester University
 Pwani University College

References

External links
The Tony Blair Faith Foundation

International college and university associations and consortia
Yale University
National University of Singapore
Peking University
University of Western Australia
Fourah Bay College
Global studies
Religion and society